Mount Friesland is a mountain rising to  in the homonymous Friesland Ridge, one of the two summits of Tangra Mountains and Livingston Island in the South Shetland Islands, Antarctica along with neighbouring St. Boris Peak. Its north rib is connected to Pliska Ridge by Nesebar Gap on the west, and to Bowles Ridge by Wörner Gap on the north. On the east Mount Friesland is connected to Presian Ridge and further on to Catalunyan Saddle and Lyaskovets Peak. On the south-southwest it is connected by a short saddle to ‘The Synagogue’ a sharp-peaked rock-cored ice formation abutting St. Boris Peak. The peak is heavily glaciated and crevassed, surmounting Huntress Glacier to the west, Perunika Glacier to the north-northwest, Huron Glacier to the northeast and Macy Glacier to the southeast.  The local weather is notoriously unpleasant and challenging; according to the seasoned Antarctic mountaineer Damien Gildea who climbed in the area, 'just about the worst weather in the world'.

History
The feature was known to American and British sealers as early as 1820–21, and variously referred to as "Peak of Frezeland", "Friezland Peak", and "Friesland Peak". In the early 1900s the name "Barnard", applied by James Weddell in 1825 to nearby Needle Peak, was transferred to this mountain. The original name has now been restored with the spelling "Friesland" that appears to have been more frequently used than any of the other versions. In order to preserve the historical memory of the area, the name Barnard Point has since been approved for the nearby point on the southeast side of the entrance to False Bay.

The first ascent of Mount Friesland was made from Juan Carlos I Base on 30 December 1991 by the Catalan climbers Francesc Sàbat and Jorge Enrique, after whom Sàbat Hill and Enrique Hill, respectively, were named. The peak was climbed and GPS surveyed by the Australian Damien Gildea and John Bath, and the Chilean Rodrigo Fica on 20 December 2003, who produced a new map of the island in 2004, based on Spanish satellite imagery and their GPS data.   The third ascent was made by the Bulgarians Lyubomir Ivanov and Doychin Vasilev from Camp Academia on 15 December 2004. All these used the Sàbat–Enrique eastern route to the peak, from Camp Academia locality (541 m) via Catalunyan Saddle (1,260 m) and Presian Ridge (1,456 m).

Elevation
The local ice relief is subject to changes, causing variations in the feature's elevation. According to the American high accuracy Reference Elevation Model of Antarctica (REMA), Mount Friesland is  higher than the central summit of St. Boris Peak and  higher than ‘The Synagogue’. However, according to the 2022 later edition of REMA Mount Friesland is  higher than the central summit of St. Boris Peak and  lower than ‘The Synagogue’.

Location
British mapping in 1968, Chilean in 1971, Argentine in 1980, Spanish in 1991, US in 2004, and Bulgarian in 1996, 2005, 2009 and 2023. Bulgarian surveys 1995/96 (estimated elevation 1684 m), 2004/05 and 2016/17.

Maps
 Chart of South Shetland including Coronation Island, &c. from the exploration of the sloop Dove in the years 1821 and 1822 by George Powell Commander of the same. Scale ca. 1:200000. London: Laurie, 1822
 South Shetland Islands. Scale 1:200000 topographic map. DOS 610 Sheet W 62 60. Tolworth, UK, 1968.
 Islas Livingston y Decepción.  Mapa topográfico a escala 1:100000.  Madrid: Servicio Geográfico del Ejército, 1991.
 L.L. Ivanov. Livingston Island: Central-Eastern Region. Scale 1:25000 topographic map.  Sofia: Antarctic Place-names Commission of Bulgaria, 1996.
 S. Soccol, D. Gildea and J. Bath. Livingston Island, Antarctica. Scale 1:100000 satellite map. The Omega Foundation, USA, 2004.
 L.L. Ivanov et al., Antarctica: Livingston Island and Greenwich Island, South Shetland Islands (from English Strait to Morton Strait, with illustrations and ice-cover distribution), 1:100000 scale topographic map, Antarctic Place-names Commission of Bulgaria, Sofia, 2005
 L.L. Ivanov. Antarctica: Livingston Island and Greenwich, Robert, Snow and Smith Islands. Scale 1:120000 topographic map. Troyan: Manfred Wörner Foundation, 2010.  (First edition 2009. )
 Antarctic Digital Database (ADD). Scale 1:250000 topographic map of Antarctica. Scientific Committee on Antarctic Research (SCAR). Since 1993, regularly upgraded and updated.
 L.L. Ivanov. Antarctica: Livingston Island and Smith Island. Scale 1:100000 topographic map. Manfred Wörner Foundation, 2017. 
 A. Kamburov and L. Ivanov. Bowles Ridge and Central Tangra Mountains: Livingston Island, Antarctica. Scale 1:25000 map. Sofia: Manfred Wörner Foundation, 2023.

See also
 List of Ultras of Antarctica
 Tangra Mountains
 South Shetland Islands

Gallery

Notes

References

  
 Mount Friesland. SCAR Composite Antarctic Gazetteer.
 Mount Friesland, Antarctica. Peakbagger.com.
 D. Gildea. Antarctic Mountains: Climbing in Antarctica.
 L. Ivanov. General Geography and History of Livingston Island. In: Bulgarian Antarctic Research: A Synthesis. Eds. C. Pimpirev and N. Chipev. Sofia: St. Kliment Ohridski University Press, 2015. pp. 17–28.

External links
 Mount Friesland. Copernix satellite image

Mountains of Antarctica
Tangra Mountains